Abdul Qader Saleh (Arabic: عبد القادر صالح, ʿAbd al-Qādir Ṣāliḥ; 1979 – 18 November 2013), also known as Haji Mare', was one of the founding commanders of the al-Tawhid Brigade, an Islamist rebel group in the Syrian Civil War.

Biography 
Saleh was from the town of Mare' north of Aleppo, and originally worked as merchant. He was married and had five children.

After taking part in the formation of the al-Tawhid Brigade in July 2012, Saleh led the brigade and other rebel groups to capture half of Aleppo at the beginning of the Battle of Aleppo. In November 2012, Saleh declared in two joint video statements with other rebel leaders in Aleppo that he and his militia believed that Sharia law should be the basis of all legislation in Syria, but that minorities should not be suppressed on this basis. He also criticised the official leadership-in-exile of the Syrian opposition, the Syrian National Coalition, saying that it should "increase the representation of revolutionary forces, and empower them within the Coalition’s apparatus and offices". His declarations were backed by the Aleppo Military Council, Ahrar al-Sham, the Conquest Brigade, the Free Men of Syria Brigade, the Ummah Brigade, and the Sultan Muhammad Brigade. Saleh's statements were seen by a regional expert as sign for the increasing radicalization and rise of Islamism among the Syrian rebels.

A member of the Supreme Military Council, Saleh had survived at least two assassination attempts. He died on 18 November 2013 in Gaziantep, Turkey, as a result of wounds sustained during an air raid on the Infantry Academy of al-Muslimiyah, north of Aleppo.

References

1979 births
2013 deaths
Syrian Islamists
Deaths by airstrike during the Syrian civil war
Members of the Free Syrian Army
People from Aleppo Governorate